Anna Eva Margaretha Larsson (born 27 February 1973) is a Swedish former footballer who played as a goalkeeper. She was part of the Sweden women's national football team at the 1996 Summer Olympics, but did not play.

Career
Larsson played club football for Jitex BK and Älvsjö AIK in Sweden. She made her international debut for Sweden on 30 October 1997, playing in the 1–3 loss to the United States. She made her second appearance as a substitute in the 0–4 loss against China on 24 January 1998, before earning her final cap on 17 March 1998 against Portugal, which finished as a 2–0 win.

Career statistics

International

See also
 Sweden at the 1996 Summer Olympics

References

External links
 
 Profile at SvenskFotboll.se

1973 births
Living people
People from Kungälv Municipality
Swedish women's footballers
Sweden women's international footballers
Olympic footballers of Sweden
Footballers at the 1996 Summer Olympics
Jitex BK players
Älvsjö AIK (women) players
Women's association football goalkeepers
Sportspeople from Västra Götaland County